VHL Championship may refer to:
Supreme Hockey League
Supreme Hockey League Championship